Yarmouk (Arabic, اليرموك) is an upmarket neighborhood (67th) located within Mansour district in Baghdad, Iraq, and adjacent to Baghdad Airport Road. It was once home to numbers of high-ranking officials from Abd-Alkareem qasim times. Yarmouk is now inhabited by people from both the Shia and Sunni sects, while it used to be the home of many Sunni officials during Saddam Hussein's rule.

Al-Yarmouk Teaching Hospital is located in Yarmouk, along with Al Yarmouk University College. The Zip code is 10015.

References
NYtimes yarmouk

Neighborhoods in Baghdad